USS Takanis Bay (CVE-89) was a  of the United States Navy, which served during World War II. She was named after Takanis Bay on the west side of Yakobi Island in Alaska (near Sitka). Launched in March 1944 and commissioned in April, she served as a carrier training vessel, operating off of San Diego. Following the end of hostilities, she repatriated troops from the Pacific theater as part of Operation Magic Carpet.

Design and description

Takanis Bay was a Casablanca-class escort carrier, the most numerous type of aircraft carriers ever built, and designed specifically to be mass-produced using prefabricated sections, in order to replace heavy early war losses. She displaced  standard,  with a full load. Her compact size necessitated the installment of an aircraft catapult at her bow end, and there were two aircraft elevators to facilitate movement of aircraft between the flight and hangar deck: one on the fore, another on the aft.

One /38 caliber dual purpose gun was mounted on the stern, and she was equipped with 16 Bofors 40 mm anti-aircraft guns in twin mounts, as well as 12 Oerlikon 20 mm cannons, which were used in an anti-aircraft capability. By the end of the war, Casablanca-class carriers had been modified to carry thirty 20 mm cannons, as a response to increasing casualties due to kamikaze attacks. Anti-aircraft guns were mounted around the perimeter of the deck. Casablanca-class escort carriers were designed to carry 27 aircraft, but she sometimes went over or under this number, particularly due to the constant turnover of pilots and aircraft for training.

Construction
The escort carrier was laid down on 16 December 1943 under a Maritime Commission contract, MC hull 1126, by Kaiser Shipbuilding Company, Vancouver, Washington. She was launched on 10 March; sponsored by Mrs. Alden R. Sanborn; transferred to the United States Navy and commissioned on 15 April 1944, Captain Anthony R. Brady in command.

Service history

After a brief shakedown, Takanis Bay reported to Naval Air Station North Island, San Diego, where she operated in support of carrier training operations. On 22 May, the first landing was made on the carrier's flight deck. Until the end of hostilities with Japan on 15 August 1945, a steady stream of carrier squadrons was trained onboard Takanis Bay, rotating off for service on a frontline carrier once they had finished qualifications. In this period, between 24 May 1944 to 28 August 1945, she qualified a record 2,509 pilots. She also engaged in the most landings of any Casablanca-class carrier: 20,159 landings. On 24 July 1945, pilots of VC-20 made 446 landings on a single day. Remarkably, only a single pilot died throughout her career as a training carrier, albeit accidents were frequent.

On 28 August 1945, she left San Diego, bound for Pearl Harbor, where she was assigned to Carrier Transport Squadron, Pacific Fleet. She joined the fleet of carriers repatriating American servicemen from around the Pacific theater. Between 28 August and 3 January 1946, she ferried about 6,500 troops. Firstly, in two trips, she returned 1,300 servicemen from Hawaii to San Diego. Late in September, the carrier was officially assigned to the Operation Magic Carpet fleet. While docked in San Diego, bunks for 800 passengers were installed in the hangar deck. Once modifications were complete, she made two more round trip voyages to Hawaii, along with a trip to the Tokyo Bay area.

Takanis Bay arrived at San Pedro, California on 2 January 1946. On 3 January, she was released from the "Magic Carpet" fleet, and ordered to Tacoma, Washington. She was moved to Puget Sound in April, where inactivation work was begun, and she was decommissioned on 18 June. Takanis Bay was reclassified CVU-89 on 12 June 1955 and was struck from the Naval Vessel Register on 1 August 1959. She was sold on 29 June 1960 to Hyman-Michaels Company, Chicago, Illinois, for scrap and broken up in Portland, Oregon.

References

Sources

Online sources

Bibliography

External links 

 

Casablanca-class escort carriers
World War II escort aircraft carriers of the United States
Ships built in Vancouver, Washington
1944 ships
S4-S2-BB3 ships